Our Beloved (Kyuntawto Chitthaw) is a Myanma film by director U Win Saung, focusing on a conflict between Myanmar Army soldiers and a drug-trafficking warlord. It has been described as a military propaganda film. The film was released on June 15, 2018.

Production
The film was funded by the Chan Thar and Red Radiance Film production houses. The film was supported by Hla Swe, who stated that "[...] those who have patriotism in their heart will like this movie."

Box office
The film did poorly, screening for only two weeks in Yangon. Reception was generally negative.

References

2018 films
Burmese drama films
Films set in Myanmar